There are two classes of acidic proteases:

 Aspartic proteases - that use a catalytic aspartic acid in their active site 
 Glutamic proteases - that use a catalytic glutamic acid in their active site (less common)